The Ministry for Women (Māori: Manatū Wāhine) is the public service department of New Zealand charged with advising the government on policies and issues affecting women. It was formerly called the Ministry for Women's Affairs (MWA), but it was announced that the name would be changed to Ministry for Women in December 2014. The minister in charge of the department is the Minister for Women (previously Minister for Women's Affairs), currently Jan Tinetti.

Main roles
The Ministry was established from 26 July 1984; the first minister was Ann Hercus. It is the smallest core government agency with a staff of 28. At the time of its establishment, a foundation goal of the Ministry was to "work towards its own abolition;" however, it continues to provide dedicated services and functions.

The Ministry's main responsibilities are:
 Providing suitable women nominees for appointment to state sector boards and committees
 Policy advice on improving outcomes for women in New Zealand
 Providing support services to the Minister of Women's Affairs
 Managing New Zealand's international obligations in relation to the status of women

Achievements
Since its formation, the Ministry has worked with external stakeholders to improve outcomes for New Zealand women. Examples of these achievements include:

 Gaining private sector commitment towards increasing the number of women on private sector boards
 Significantly increasing the number of women on state sector boards
 Conducting ground-breaking research on sexual violence, which influenced the Court of Appeal in revising sentencing guidelines for sexual violation offences
 Contributing to the introduction of Paid Parental Leave and Flexible Work provisions
 Refocusing Out of School Services, including contributing to the establishment of extended services in low decile schools
 Influencing domestic violence legislation
 Contributing to improving the effectiveness of sexuality education in schools.

In 2011, the New Zealand Institute for Economic Research ranked the Ministry first out of 22 government departments for the quality of its policy advice and briefings to the Minister.

Areas of focus
The Ministry's policy work is focused on three priority areas:

 increasing the economic independence of women
 increasing the number of women in leadership
 increased the safety of women from violence.

These three priorities feed into the Government's objectives of lifting New Zealand's economic performance and building a safer New Zealand.

Greater economic independence
The Ministry's work in the 'greater economic independence' area focuses on "enabling women to make informed choices that lead to better lifetime incomes". Efforts in this area focus on the factors that can support women to more fully access economic opportunities and resources, such as:

 supporting women on low incomes and benefits into sustainable, quality work
 encouraging women into higher paid, less-traditionally female work
 strengthening enablers of women's employment, such as affordable, quality childcare, flexible work and a tax-transfer system that ensures an adequate net return from paid work.

There are two performance indicators to measure the impact of the Ministry's work in this area:

 Women's income: the percentage of women in the lowest two income quintiles will reduce from 59 percent
 Women's qualifications: The percentage of industry trainees who are women, including Maori and Pacific women, will increase from 29 percent. The percentage of graduates at bachelor level or higher in information technology and engineering and related fields who are women will increase from the range of 21–23 percent.

Women in leadership
There is compelling evidence that greater gender diversity in governance correlates with better decision making and organisational performance, providing economic and other benefits. Having more women in leadership roles ensures a wider range of views for key decisions, and brings stronger connections with customers, stakeholders and investors. There is a need for a dual focus on demand for and supply of women board members.

The Ministry assists decision makers to achieve greater diversity in governance, in both the public and private sectors, by making the case for change and advising on effective strategies to realise change.

The Ministry also assists women to know about the type of governance roles that align with their skills and interests and how to pursue those roles. The Ministry provides women candidates for vacancies on state sector boards and, on request, for other entities.

The Ministry also operates a Nominations Service, which puts forward appropriate women candidates for a range of governance roles.

Safety from violence
Intimate partner violence and sexual violence are the most common forms of violence against women in New Zealand, and are of great cost to individuals, their families and the economy. Treasury has estimated that sexual offending costs the New Zealand economy $1.2 billion a year and is by far the most expensive crime per incident. The consequences of this violence can be long-lasting, with adverse effects on health, relationships, children's welfare and education, employment, productivity, earnings, and quality of life.

The Ministry works with other government departments on issues of intimate partner and sexual violence, with particular attention to minimising the incidence of revictimisation, and an increasing focus on prevention.

Its recent work has focused on: 
 building on a 2009 research project that looked at effective interventions for adult victim/survivors of sexual violence
 monitoring progress and outcomes of policy developments in other countries, to apply lessons relevant to New Zealand

There are two performance indicators to measure the impact of the Ministry's work in this area:
 The percentage of women who experience intimate partner violence at some time in their lifetime will decrease from 25 percent.
 The percentage of women who experience sexual violence at some time in their lifetime will decrease from 29 percent.

Ministers for Women

References

External links
 

New Zealand
Ministries established in 1984
1984 establishments in New Zealand
New Zealand Public Service departments
Women in New Zealand